The 2001 Davis Cup (also known as the 2001 Davis Cup by NEC for sponsorship purposes) was the 90th edition of the Davis Cup, the most important tournament between national teams in men's tennis. 139 teams entered the competition, 16 in the World Group, 29 in the Americas Zone, 32 in the Asia/Oceania Zone, and 62 in the Europe/Africa Zone. Angola, Burkina Faso, Gabon, Mali and Rwanda made their first appearances in the tournament.

France defeated Australia in the final, held at the Rod Laver Arena in Melbourne Park, Melbourne, Australia, on 30 November–2 December, to win their 9th title and their first since 1996. The French team achieved victory despite not playing a single match on home soil.

World Group

Draw

Final
Australia vs. France

World Group Qualifying Round

Date: 21–23 September; 12–14 October

The eight losing teams in the World Group first round ties and eight winners of the Zonal Group I final round ties competed in the World Group Qualifying Round for spots in the 2002 World Group.

Americas Zone

Group I

Group II

Group III
 Venue: Cuba
 Date: 14–18 March

Final standings

  and  promoted to Group II in 2002.
  and  relegated to Group IV in 2002.

Group IV
 Venue: Cercle Bellevue, Port-au-Prince, Haiti
 Date: 5–11 March

Final standings

  and  promoted to Group III in 2002.

Asia/Oceania Zone

Group I

Group II

Group III
 Venue: Rizal Memorial Sports Complex, Manila, Philippines
 Date: 7–11 February

Final standings

  and  promoted to Group II in 2002.
  and  relegated to Group IV in 2002.

Group IV
 Venue: Abu Dhabi Airport Golf and Tennis Club, Abu Dhabi, United Arab Emirates
 Date: 25–29 April

Final standings

  and  promoted to Group III in 2002.

Europe/Africa Zone

Group I

Group II

Group III

Zone A
 Venue: National Centre, Gaborone, Botswana
 Date: 16–20 May

Final standings

  and  promoted to Group II in 2002.
  and  relegated to Group IV in 2002.

Zone B
 Venue: Rose Hill Club, Beau Bassin-Rose Hill, Mauritius
 Date: 23–27 May

Final standings

  and  promoted to Group II in 2002.
  relegated to Group IV in 2002.

Group IV

Zone A
 Venue: Nicosia Tennis Club, Nicosia, Cyprus
 Date: 16–20 May

Group A

Group B

  and  promoted to Group III in 2002.

Zone B
 Venue: Marsa Sports Club, Marsa, Malta
 Date: 9–13 May

Group A

Group B

  and  promoted to Group III in 2002.

References

General

Specific

External links
Davis Cup official website

 
Davis Cups by year
Davis Cup
Davis Cup